The 1953 New Mexico Lobos football team represented the University of New Mexico in the Skyline Conference during the 1953 college football season.  In their first season under head coach Bob Titchenal, the Lobos compiled a 5–3–1 record (3–2–1 against Skyline opponents), finished fourth in the conference, and outscored all opponents by a total of 154 to 103.

New Mexico center Larry White was selected by the Associated Press (AP) as a first-team player on the 1953 All-Skyline Conference football team. Three other New Mexico players received second-team honors: end Ray Guerette, guard Ralph Matteuchi, and tailback Bobby Lee. Lee ranked third in the Skyline Conference with 624 rushing yards on 110 carries (5.7 yards per carry).

Bob Titchenal, who had previously been an assistant coach for Denver, was selected by the AP as the Skyline Conference coach of the year.

Schedule

References

New Mexico
New Mexico Lobos football seasons
New Mexico Lobos football